Naswār (Cyrillic script: насва́р), also called nās (ناس; на́с) or nasvay (نسوای; насвай), is a moist, powdered tobacco dip consumed mostly in Afghanistan and surrounding countries. Naswar is stuffed in the floor of the mouth under the lower lip, or inside the cheek, for extended periods of time, usually for 15 to 30 minutes. It is similar to dipping tobacco and snus.

History
Naswar was introduced into Western Europe by a Spanish monk named Ramon Pane after Columbus' second voyage to the Americas during 1493-1496. In 1561, Jean Nicot the French ambassador in Lisbon, Portugal, sent naswar to Catherine de' Medici to treat her son's persistent migraine.

Use in South and Central Asia
The green powder form is used most frequently. It is made by pouring water into a cement-lined cavity, to which slaked lime (calcium hydroxide) and air-cured, sun-dried, powdered tobacco is added. Indigo is added to the mixture to impart color, and juniper ash may be added as flavoring. 

Currently, the countries of the region freely sell naswar in the markets, usually on trays with cigarettes and sunflower seeds. The only exception is Turkmenistan, where in 2008 President Gurbanguly Berdimuhamedow signed a decree banning the production, sale, use, and import of naswar.

In 2011 naswar was included in the list of narcotic and psychoactive substances to be controlled in Kazakhstan.

Use in Russia and Eastern Europe
On the territory of Russia, naswar is not a traditional product, but it gained popularity especially among teenagers. It was sold in the markets of Moscow and in other cities of the Urals, Volga, and other regions of the country. Its trade was usually conducted on trays with spices. According to the association of tobacco distributors "Grandtabak", in the first half of 2004, Russia's import of naswar or "chewing tobacco" amounted to almost 67 tons (total value of 16,500 US dollars), primarily from Kazakhstan, Kyrgyzstan, and Tajikistan. On 23 February 2013, the Russian State Duma signed a federal law (N 15-ФЗ) which banned both wholesale and retail naswar from 1 June 2013 onward in Russia.

On the use of naswar Belarusian physicians reported and send patient's medical information to law enforcement agencies. In Estonia, naswar is being distributed to nightclubs.

Characteristics 
There are two forms of naswar; powder, and a paste cake style mixed with lime. It has a very pungent and powerful smell, resembling that of a fresh bale of coastal hay, and has a subtle flavor as it mixes with the saliva. The nicotine effect can occur within 5 minutes after intake, producing a slight burning sensation on the inner lip and tongue.

Manufacture
Sun and heat-dried tobacco leaves, slaked lime, ash from tree bark, and flavoring and coloring agents are mixed together. Water is added and the mixture is rolled into balls.

Nas: tobacco, ash, cotton or sesame oil, water, and sometimes gum.

Naswar: tobacco, slaked lime, indigo, cardamom, oil, menthol, water.

Controversy
In November 2006 an editorial in the newspaper Daily Times in Pakistan caused some controversy over its allegedly biased representations of Pashtun predilection for naswar.

Side effects
The major side effect of using naswar is addiction, and it becomes difficult to get rid of it. It is also increasingly known that naswar often causes oral and throat cancer. It is also heavily recommended to restrict use of naswar due to major side effects.

See also
Dipping tobacco
Smokeless tobacco
Snus
Khat

References

External links
Supermarket in Ras al Khaimah Shut Down for Selling Naswar.  GulfNews.com

Tobacco products
Tobacco in Pakistan
Tobacco in Afghanistan
Pashtun culture